The Park Northpoint is a Class A (see Office Grading) office park planned by AIG/Lincoln for development north of Moscow, Russia, near the Moscow Outer Ring Road (popularly known as the "MKAD") and the Altufyevo metro station. The development will comprise roughly 250,000 square meters (approx. 2,700,000 sq. ft.) of rentable office area, 11,000 square meters (approx. 120,000 sq. ft.) of rentable retail area, a sports complex, a hotel, and underground parking providing a ratio of 1 parking space per 40 square meters (approx. 430 sq. ft.) of rentable office area.

Building specifications

The business park will consist of 17 buildings: 15 office buildings, a 220-room hotel, and a sports complex.

The roughly 4,200 square meter (approx. 45,000 sq. ft.) sports complex will be multi-functional, with the capacity to accommodate both conferences and sporting activities, and will house a swimming pool.

The business park's underground parking garage will span the entire area of the site, and provide approximately 6,600 parking spaces.

Development and management

The Park Northpoint will be developed in phases, with the first office building scheduled for completion in 2014.

The office park will be developed and managed by AIG/Lincoln, which has developed over 2,500,000 square meters of property (approx. 26,910,000 square feet), and manages over 1,480,000 square meters (approx. 15,931,000 square feet) of office, industrial, retail, residential, and entertainment property across Central and Eastern Europe. In addition to The Park Northpoint, AIG/Lincoln's other projects in Moscow, Russia include White Square and White Gardens.

Location and access

The Park Northpoint will be located just off of the Moscow Outer Ring Road ("MKAD"), where the MKAD intersects with Altufyevskoe Highway, roughly 2.5 kilometers (approx. 1.5 miles) from the Altufyevo metro station.

Such major retail stores as Auchan, Leroy Merlin, Decathlon, and Selgros are within walking distance of the business park's development site. Also in the nearby vicinity are the headquarters office of Toyota Motor of Russia, the suburban Moscow office of Mercedes-Benz, and an expansive natural forest.

Buildings and structures in Moscow
Proposed buildings and structures in Russia